William Vincent Glynn (July 30, 1925 – January 15, 2013) was an American professional baseball first baseman, who played in Major League Baseball (MLB) for all or portions of four seasons with the Philadelphia Phillies and Cleveland Indians –.

Born in Sussex, New Jersey, Glynn attended Franklin High School, where he played baseball, basketball, and football.

The Blue Sox were then a farm club of the Philadelphia Phillies. He briefly played for the 1949 Phils as a late September call-up. Traded to the Sacramento Solons of the Pacific Coast League after the  campaign, he was acquired by the Indians in July of the following season. Glynn appeared in Games 1 and 3, striking out against Marv Grissom in the tenth inning of the former, and doubling off Rubén Gómez in the latter. His Indians lost both contests as the Giants swept them in four straight games.

In 310 games over four MLB seasons, Glynn posted a .249 batting average (170-for-684) with 94 runs, 22 doubles, four triples, 10 home runs, 56 runs batted in (RBI), and 61 bases on balls. He finished his career with a .989 fielding percentage as a first baseman.

References

External links

1925 births
2013 deaths
American expatriate baseball players in Canada
Americus Phillies players
Baltimore Orioles (IL) players
Baseball players from New Jersey
Cleveland Indians players
Indianapolis Indians players
Major League Baseball first basemen
People from Sussex, New Jersey
Philadelphia Phillies players
Sacramento Solons players
San Diego Padres (minor league) players
Seattle Rainiers players
Sportspeople from Sussex County, New Jersey
Toronto Maple Leafs (International League) players
United States Army personnel of World War II
Utica Blue Sox players